Perch may refer to:

Perch (surname), a surname (and list of people with that name)
Perch (unit), unit of measure for length, area, or volume
Perch SSSI a Site of Special Scientific Interest in Somerset, England
Perch (equilibristic), an equilibristic balancing act
 The Perch (Binsey), a historic pub in Binsey, Oxfordshire, England
The Perch, a historic house in Austin, Texas, USA, part of Granger House and The Perch

Fish
Perch, the common name for the freshwater fish in the genus Perca
Balkhash perch (Perca schrenkii)
European perch (Perca fluviatilis)
Yellow perch (Perca flavescens)
Temperate perch, fish of the family Percichthyidae
Several other species of fish, including:
Surfperch (Embiotocidae) several species, northern Pacific shore fish, including
Shiner perch (Cymatogaster aggregata)
 Pile perch, genus Rhacochilus along with shiner perch, commonly seen around pier pilings along the Pacific shore of North America
Barber perch (Caesioperca rasor)
Estuary perch (Macquaria colonorum)
Golden perch (Macquaria ambigua)
Macquarie perch (Macquaria australasica)
Nile perch (Lates niloticus)
Pirate perch (Aphredoderus sayanus)
White perch (Morone americana)
Rock perch (Ambloplites rupestris)
Sacramento perch (Archoplites interruptus)
Silver perch several species, including:
Bairdiella chrysoura, native to the East Coast of the United States
Bidyanus bidyanus, endemic to Australia
Leiopotherapon plumbeus, endemic to the Philippines
Climbing perch family (climbing gourami, Anabantidae)
Lepomis species are often called perch in some areas of the United States, especially in the Ozarks region.
Japanese perch (Coreoperca kawamebari)
Pond perch (Lepomis gibbosus)
Blue perch (Badis badis)
 Japanese seaperch, the common name for the saltwater fish in the genus Sebastes
Japanese white seaperch (Sebastes cheni)
Japanese red seaperch (Sebastes inermis)
Japanese black seaperch (Sebastes ventricosus)